The Golden Goblet Award for Best Feature Film (Chinese: 金爵奖最佳影片) is the highest prize awarded to competing films at the Shanghai International Film Festival.

Awards Winners

References